Jardy-Kayyngdy Game Reserve is a protected area in Panfilov District, Chüy Region, Kyrgyzstan.

References
 

Game reserves in Kyrgyzstan
Protected areas established in 1975